Oakwood is a London Underground station on the Piccadilly line. It is the second most northerly station on the line, between Southgate and Cockfosters stations, and is in Travelcard Zone 5.  The station is on the edge of the Oakwood area of Enfield (N14) and is situated at the junction of Bramley Road (A110) and Chase Road (the other end of Chase Road is close to Southgate Underground station). This station has step-free access after the upgrades made to the station between October and December 2007.

History
The station opened on 13 March 1933 as part of the Cockfosters extension, its original name being Enfield West. The station did not appear on the original plans to extend the Piccadilly line beyond Finsbury Park, which only provided for seven additional stations, however it served as the line's terminus for a brief period before Cockfosters station was opened.

The station building is a fine example of the architecture Charles Holden designed for the Piccadilly line extensions, with a large and imposing box-shaped ticket hall surrounded by lower structures containing shops. The ceiling of the booking hall is particularly monumental and bold. The whole design mirrors proportions found in classical architecture, albeit in a distinctly 20th century structure. The dimensions of the ticket hall are approximately a "double-cube" (its front elevation is roughly twice its height and width).  The station is similar to Holden's slightly earlier designs for Sudbury Town and Acton Town stations at the western end of Piccadilly line. Oakwood Station is a Grade II* listed building.

Like other extensions of the London Underground lines, the opening of the Cockfosters extension stimulated the rapid development of new suburbs and much of the open countryside that existed in 1930 when construction started was quickly covered by new housing developments.

2006–07 upgrade

In early October 2006 to December 2007, the station underwent an upgrade as part of London Underground's £10billion upgrade to the whole of the London Underground Network. As part of this, a new lift was installed to provide step-free access to the platforms. The Public Address system was also improved, with new information indicators installed on the platforms and inside the ticket hall. In addition 27 new CCTV cameras were installed in the station bringing the total number to 29.

Station name
Before the station opened, the Underground Electric Railways Company of London (forerunner of London Underground) suggested names for it including Oakwood, Merryhills and East Barnet, but it was named Enfield West at opening and renamed Enfield West (Oakwood) the following year.

The Enfield West station name proved unpopular with passengers heading for shops and offices in Enfield, as it is about 2 miles away.

Following protests from Southgate Council, it was eventually renamed Oakwood on 1 September 1946.

Operations
Currently a few trains in the early morning and late evening enter/leave service at Oakwood, from Cockfosters Depot (which has an entrance point north of Oakwood station). There is additionally a crossover for trains to reverse, and the possibility of an extra platform built using an existing siding has been mooted to provide extra peak-hour reversing capacity.

Connections
London Buses routes 121, 307 and 377 serve the station.

References

External links

London Transport Museum Photographic Archive

Piccadilly line stations
London Underground Night Tube stations
Tube stations in the London Borough of Enfield
Grade II* listed buildings in the London Borough of Enfield
Grade II* listed railway stations
Former London Electric Railway stations
Railway stations in Great Britain opened in 1933
Charles Holden railway stations
Oakwood, London